The 2020–21 Ukrainian Premier League season was the 30th top-level football club competition since the dissolution of the Soviet Union and the 13th since the establishment of the Ukrainian Premier League.

The defending champion was the 13-times winner Shakhtar Donetsk. On 25 April 2021, Dynamo Kyiv won the record 16th title with three matches remaining, after the victory over Inhulets Petrove in the Round 23 home game.

The season started on 21 August 2020 and was initially set to end on 15 May 2021. On 7 April 2021 it was announced that most of clubs voted to end competitions a week early on 9 May 2021.

Summary 
This season was the first since the 2015–16, when the league consisted of double round-robin tournament, without the second stage and division to the two groups. This season also had the latest start of the competition in history.

A season, that usually starts in July, was postponed for a month due to the COVID-19 pandemic situation in Ukraine. From 10 September to 13 October 2020, attendance restrictions were lifted and stadiums were allowed some spectators not to exceed about 25% of stadium capacity.

At least four managers of the UPL openly expressed their opinion not to postpone any games due to the COVID-19 cases. Nevertheless two games of the season's fall half were postponed to spring.

For the next 2021–22 season, the league is expected to expand again to 16 teams as part of the league's expansion plan. As a consequence, this season the lowest-ranked team from Ukrainian Premier League got relegated to Ukrainian First League, and at the same time the top three teams from the First League will gain promotion to the Premier League next season.

Teams
This season, as it was announced earlier, the Ukrainian Premier League has been expanded to 14 teams, which includes 11 teams from the previous season and the top three teams from the 2019–20 Ukrainian First League.

Promoted teams
 FC Mynai – the champion of the 2019–20 Ukrainian First League (debut)
 Rukh Lviv – runner-up of the 2019–20 Ukrainian First League (debut)
 Inhulets Petrove – third place of the 2019–20 Ukrainian First League (debut)

Location map 
The following displays the location of teams.

Stadiums 

Three of the qualified to the date teams play their matches outside of home towns. The minimum threshold for the stadium's capacity in the UPL is 5,000 (Article 10, paragraph 7.2).

The following stadiums are regarded as home grounds:

Notes

Personnel and sponsorship

Managerial changes

League table

Standings

Results
Teams play each other twice on a home and away basis.

Season statistics

Top goalscorers

Assists

Hat-tricks

Awards

Monthly awards

Round awards

See also 
 2020–21 Ukrainian First League
 2020–21 Ukrainian Second League
 2020–21 Ukrainian Football Amateur League
 2020–21 Ukrainian Cup
 List of Ukrainian football transfers summer 2020
 List of Ukrainian football transfers winter 2020–21

Notes

References

External links 
 Official website of the Ukrainian Premier League

Ukrainian Premier League seasons
1
Ukraine